East Bde Maka Ska is a neighborhood within the Calhoun-Isles community in the U.S. city of Minneapolis. It was formerly known as East Calhoun prior to August 2021. The neighborhood is located south of the East Isles neighborhood and its northern portion along with parts of the East Isles, Lowry Hill East, and South Uptown neighborhoods forms the city's Uptown district. East Bde Maka Ska is bordered on the north by Lake Street, on the east by Hennepin Avenue, on the south by West 36th Street and on the west by Bde Maka Ska.

History

Neighborhood name 
The neighborhood was named East Calhoun, after the formerly named Lake Calhoun, prior to August 2021. In the aftermath of murder of George Floyd and greater awareness of racial justice issues, community members sought to change the name. The Minneapolis City Council approved a name change to East Bde Maka Ska change on July 23, 2021, which became effective July 31, 2021. The East Bde Maka Ska name is intended to honor the history of the Dakota people in the area.

The neighborhood organization is referred to as ECCO (East Calhoun Community Organization).

Environmental conservation 
The neighborhood has been recognized for its environmental conservation efforts. It was one of the first neighborhoods in the  Minneapolis area to adopt organic waste recycling, a relatively new waste management solution, and has been used as an example of a successful organics recycling project. The city of Minneapolis placed a curbside organic waste pickup pilot program in the neighborhood in 2015. 

The neighborhood pioneered programs such as "Waste Watchers", a recycling and organics program designed to raise awareness and strengthen community ties to waste reduction, as well as the Turn Off Lights Behind You (TOLBY) program, designed to help families and children remember to turn off lights in unoccupied rooms in their households to reduce energy consumption.

See also 

 Bde Maka Ska Public Art Project

References

External links
Minneapolis Neighborhood Profile - East Calhoun
East Bde Maka Ska Neighborhood Organization

Neighborhoods in Minneapolis